Marlon Stewart (born February 18, 1997) is an American professional basketball player who last played for the Caballeros de Culiacán of the Circuito de Baloncesto de la Costa del Pacífico. He played college basketball for the North Dakota Fighting Hawks.

High school
Stewart grew up in Rock Island, Illinois. He attended Davenport West High School during his freshman and sophomore years of high school, but then transferred to North Scott High School in Eldridge, Iowa. While there, he helped North Scott win their first-ever state championship in 2015 and was named to the 4A All-State first team.

Recruiting
On September 20, 2014, Stewart was offered by Creighton, then committed only two days later.

College career
Stewart played for one year under Greg McDermott at Creighton before transferring to the University of North Dakota to play with former high school teammate Cortez Seales.

After redshirting during the 2016-17 season, Stewart was a three-year starter for the Fighting Hawks averaging 15 points, 3.8 rebounds, and 4 assists per game. He scored a career-high 35 points on February 22, 2020, against North Dakota State, which also included the game-winning shot as North Dakota won 71–68. Prior to his senior year, head coach Brian Jones left the team and Paul Sather was hired. During that year, the Fighting Hawks made it to the Summit League tournament championship game where they lost to North Dakota State. Stewart was named to the All-Tournament team and also was named during that year to the All-Summit League first team. He averaged 18.6 points, 5.5 rebounds and 5.1 assists per game.

Professional career

Kirchheim Knights (2021)
On September 16, 2021, Stewart signed with the Kirchheim Knights of the German ProA league. He parted ways with the team on September 29.

Lakeland Magic (2021)
Stewart was selected with the 20th pick in the 2021 NBA G League draft by the Lakeland Magic. However, he was waived on December 1, after five appearances.

Birmingham Squadron (2021–2022)
After playing for the Birmingham Squadron in 2021, Stewart was then later waived on January 12, 2022.

Venados de Mazatlán (2022)
Stewart signed with the Venados de Mazatlán of the Circuito de Baloncesto de la Costa del Pacífico (CIBACOPA) ahead of the 2022 season. He recorded 28 points, four rebounds and four assists in the season opener, a 98–96 victory over the Caballeros de Culiacán. He made 20 appearances for the team, averaging 15 points per game.

Caballeros de Culiacán (2022)
Stewart joined the Caballeros de Culiacán, also in the CIBACOPA, in May 2022.

Career stats

College
Per

|-
| style="text-align:left;"| 2015–16
| style="text-align:left;"| Creighton
| 13 || 0 || 3.1 || .231 || .167 ||  || 0.2 || 0.0 || 0.0 || 0.0 || 0.5
|-
| style="text-align:left;"| 2017–18
| style="text-align:left;"| North Dakota
| 32 || 31 || 28.1 || .432 || .303 || .763 || 2.7 || 3.0 || 1.3 || 0.1 || 11.7
|-
| style="text-align:left;"| 2018–19
| style="text-align:left;"| North Dakota
| 19 || 15 || 31.8 || .410 || .326 || .772 || 3.0 || 3.8 || 0.8 || 0.1 || 14.3
|-
| style="text-align:left;"| 2019–20
| style="text-align:left;"| North Dakota
| 33 || 33 || 34.2 || .434 || .356 || .783 || 5.5 || 5.1 || 0.7 || 0.1 || 18.7

References

External links
 Marlon Stewart at RealGM
 Creighton Bluejays bio
 North Dakota Fighting Hawks bio

1997 births
Living people
21st-century African-American sportspeople
African-American basketball players
American men's basketball players
American expatriate basketball people in Germany
American expatriate basketball people in Mexico
Basketball players from Iowa
Birmingham Squadron players
Caballeros de Culiacán players
Creighton Bluejays men's basketball players
Lakeland Magic players
North Dakota Fighting Hawks men's basketball players
People from Rock Island, Illinois
Point guards
Venados de Mazatlán (basketball) players
VfL Kirchheim Knights players